The Search for Everything World Tour was a concert tour by American recording artist John Mayer in support of his seventh studio album The Search for Everything (2017). The tour played 62 shows and visited the Americas as well as Europe, beginning on March 31, 2017 in Albany, United States, and concluding on October 29, 2017 in Buenos Aires, Argentina.

Background
All tickets went on sale February 3, 2017, and began on March 31, 2017, and will finish on May 12, 2017. All tickets of the first leg North America shows include a free CD copy of the new album. The second leg of tour dates were announced on February 24, 2017 running July 18-September 3, 2017. with tickets going on sale March 4, 2017.

Opening acts
The Record Company 
LANY 
Andreas Moe 
The Night Game 
Dawes 
Rodrigo y Gabriela

Setlist
The following setlist was obtained from the concert held on April 12, 2017, at the Schottenstein center in Columbus, Ohio. It does not represent all concerts for the duration of the tour.
"Belief"
"Why Georgia"
"Queen of California"
"Slow Dancing in a Burning Room"
"Love on the Weekend"
"In Your Atmosphere (LA Song)"
"Comfortable"
"Free Fallin'"
"Your Body is a Wonderland"
"Cross Road Blues"
"Ain't No Sunshine"
"Bold as Love"
"Helpless"
"Moving On and Getting Over"
"If I Ever Get Around to Living"
"Still Feel Like Your Man"
"Dear Marie"
"Roll It on Home"
"In Repair"
"You're Gonna Live Forever in Me"

Tour dates and box office score data

Festivals and other miscellaneous performances
This concert was a part of the "California Mid-State Fair"

Personnel
Steve Jordan – drums
John Mayer – vocals, guitars
Pino Palladino – bass
Larry Goldings – keyboards
David Ryan Harris – guitar
Tiffany Palmer – vocals
Carlos Ricketts – vocals
Isaiah Sharkey – guitar

References

External links
 John Mayer official site

2017 concert tours
John Mayer concert tours